Pao Pao is a village on the island of Mo'orea in French Polynesia.

Pao Pao or Paopao may also refer to:

 "Pao Pao", a 1959 song by Monchito and His Mambo Royals
 "Pao Pao" (Kokkinou song), a  2000 hit by Elli Kokkinou
 Pao Pao, a story by Pier Vittorio Tondelli
 Pao Pao Bay, Mo'orea, Tahiti
 Paopao (canoe), a single-outrigger canoe made from a single log in the Pacific islands of Tuvalu
 Pao-pao ("Cannonball"), childhood nickname of Jackie Chan (born 1954), Hong Kong actor and filmmaker
 Joe Paopao (born 1955), American former quarterback and coach in the Canadian Football League